Canadia Bank is one of the largest local banks in Cambodia. The bank was established in 1991 and became privatized in 1998. As one of the leading commercial banks in Cambodia, Canadia Bank has 64 branches across in 25 provinces and municipality in Cambodia. As of 2021, Canadia Bank has total assets of US$7.6 billion, with net profit of US$125 million.

History
Canadia Bank was established on 11 November 1991, as the Canadia Gold & Trust Corporation Limited, under a joint-venture with overseas Cambodians and the National Bank of Cambodia, and as a sole office financial institution managed by the former staff of the National Bank of Cambodia and Canadian Cambodian shareholders. One of the founders is Oknha Dr. Pung Kheav Se (方侨生), a well known Chinese Cambodia businessman of Teochew descent who is currently chairing the bank. The main activities were based on gold transaction, gold plaque manufacture and credit to local merchants.

On 19 April 1993, the name of the institution was changed to "Canadia Bank Ltd.", and subsequently to "Canadia Bank plc." on 16 December 2003, as a commercial bank registered under the Ministry of Commerce and the National Bank of Cambodia. Since privatization in 1998, the bank has become one of the largest local banks. It offers various financial services through its 61 branches within Cambodia and 23 international correspondent banks, and currently holds and plans to extend noteworthy agricultural interests. Canadia Bank has opened in 2014 a Representative Office in Shanghai for the Chinese Market.

Canadia Bank is a part of Canadia Investment Holding along with several well-known companies in the Kingdom of Cambodia, including Overseas Cambodian Investment Corporation (OCIC) which are the main developer and investor of the New Phnom Penh International Airport, Chroy Changvar Satellite City, Koh Pich Island, Koh Norea Island, and other projects within Cambodia.

Timeline
11 November 1991 - Canadia Bank is established under the name "Canadia Gold and Trust Corporation Limited"
19 April 1993 - The name of the then corporation is changed to "Canadia Bank LTD"
16 December 2003 - The name is changed from "Canadia Bank LTD" to "Canadia Bank PLC"
2009 - Canadia Tower opened its doors for business"
2013 - Mobile Banking & Internet Banking launched"
2020 - New modern website launched https://www.canadiabank.com.kh/about"
11 November 2021 - Canadia Bank celebrates 30th year in Cambodia's market
5 February 2023 - Canadia Bank announces official launch of All-New Canadia Bank App​​ for Mobiles

Competition
Canadia Bank's main competitors are ACLEDA Bank, JTrust Royal Bank, Sathapana Bank, Campu Bank, ABA Bank, Phillip Bank, Wing Bank Cambodia Asia Bank, Maybank Cambodia, Woori Bank, and Vattanac Bank.

See also
List of Cambodia-related topics
List of Banks in Cambodia

Notes

External links
Overseas Cambodian Investment Corporation (OCIC)
Canadia Bank PLC - English version
Canadia Bank PLC - Khmer version

Banks of Cambodia
Privately held companies of Cambodia
Banks established in 1991
Companies based in Phnom Penh
Cambodian companies established in 1991